Brisaster moseleyi is a species of sea urchins of the family Schizasteridae. Their armour is covered with spines. Brisaster moseleyi was first scientifically described in 1881 by Alexander Emanuel Agassiz.

References 

moseleyi